The Gomero wall gecko or La Gomera gecko (Tarentola gomerensis), also known as perenquén in the Canary Islands, is a species of lizard in the family Phyllodactylidae.
It is endemic to La Gomera.

Its natural habitats are temperate shrubland, Mediterranean-type shrubby vegetation, rocky areas, rocky shores, pastureland, plantations, rural gardens, and urban areas.

References

 Carranza, S., Arnold, E. N., Mateo, J. A., Geniez, P. (2002). Relationships and evolution of the North African geckos, Geckonia and Tarentola (Reptilia : Gekkonidae), based on mitochondrial and nuclear DNA sequences. Molecular Phylogenetics and Evolution, 23 (2): 244–256.
 Carranza, S., Arnold, E. N., Mateo, J. A., López-Jurado, L. F. (2000). Long-distance colonization and radiation in gekkonid lizards, Tarentola (Reptilia: Gekkonidae), revealed by mitochondrial DNA sequences. Proc. R. Soc. London B, 267: 637–649.
 Glaw, F., Schmidt, K. (2003). Uber die Irisfarbung der Kanarischen Mauergeckos Tarentola delalandii und Tarentola gomerensis (Sauria: Gekkonidae). Gekkota, 4: 40–42.
 Joger, U. (1984a). Die Radiation der Gattung Tarentola in Makaronesien. Cour. Forsch.-Inst. Senckenberg, 71: 91–111.
 Joger, U. (1984b). Morphologische und biochemisch-immunologische Untersuchungen zur Systematik und Evolution der Gattung Tarentola (Reptilia: Gekkonidae). Zool. Jb. Anat., 112: 137–256.
 Joger, U. (1998). Tarentola gomerensis Joger & Bischoff, 1983 – Gomera Gecko. pp. 177–184. En: Bischoff, W. (Ed.). Die Reptilien der Kanarischen Inseln, der Selvagens-Inseln und des Madeira-Archipels. En: Böhme, W. (Ed.). Handbuch der Reptilien und Amphibien Europas. Band 6. Aula-Verlag, Wiebelsheim.
 Joger, U., Bischoff, W. (1983). Zwei neue Taxa der Gattung Tarentola (Reptilia: Sauria: Gekkonidae) von den Kanarischen Inseln. Bonn.zool. Beitr., 34 (4): 459–468.
 Mateo, J. A. (2002). Tarentola gomerensis Joger & Bischoff, 1983. Pracan (o perenquén gomero). pp. 186–187. En: Pleguezuelos, J. M., Márquez, R., Lizana, M. (Eds.). Atlas y Libro Rojo de los anfibios y reptiles de España. Dirección General de Conservación de la Naturaleza-Asociación Herpetológica Española (2ª impresión). Madrid
 Nogales, M., López, M., Jiménez-Asensio, J., Larruga, J. M., Hernández, M., González, P. (1998). Evolution and biogeography of the genus Tarentola (Sauria : Gekkonidae) in the Canary Islands, inferred from mitochondrial DNA sequences. Journal of Evolutionary Biology, 11 (4): 481–494.

Reptiles of the Canary Islands
gomerensis
Reptiles described in 1983
Taxonomy articles created by Polbot